Under the Venezuelan Constitution, the president of Venezuela is the head of state and head of government of Venezuela. As chief of the executive branch and face of the government as a whole, the presidency is the highest political office in the country by influence and recognition. The president is also the commander-in-chief of the National Bolivarian Armed Forces of Venezuela. The president is directly elected through a popular vote to a six-year term. Since the 2009 constitutional referendum, any person can be elected to the office an indefinite number of times. Upon the death, resignation, or removal from office of an incumbent president, the vice president assumes the office. The president must be at least 30 years of age, and has to be a "natural born" citizen of Venezuela, and cannot possess any other citizenship.

This list includes only those persons who were sworn into office as president following the establishment of the independent State of Venezuela, which took place on January 13, 1830. There have been 46 people sworn into office, and 64 presidencies, as several politicians (most prominently between 1830 and 1953) have held the office more than once. José Antonio Páez, the first president, was inaugurated in 1830. Antonio Guzmán Blanco served during the most terms, with three. Juan Vicente Gómez has served during the longest (although interrupted by interim presidencies), with over 27 years. Romulo Betancourt served from 1959 until 1964. Hugo Chávez served the longest uninterrupted period in office with 11 consecutive years, from his restoration to power in April 2002 until his death in March 2013.

The current presidency has been disputed between Juan Guaido and Nicolás Maduro since January 10, 2019, in the ongoing Venezuelan presidential crisis. Maduro was elected to his first term in 2013 but received backlash from opposing Venezuelans and some members  of the international community especially the United States.  Maduro was accused of authoritarian rule and fraud in the elections that were held on May 20, 2018. Guaido, the president of the National Assembly of Venezuela, took the oath of office as interim president on January 23, 2019, citing Article 233 of the Constitution of Venezuela to "cease the usurpation, hold a transitional government, and call for new elections". The office remained disputed until December 2022 when opposition parties voted to dissolve the Guaidó government effective as of 5 January 2023.

History
The presidential designation encompasses only those persons who were sworn into office as President of Venezuela following Venezuela's declaration of independence from Spanish colonial rule, which took effect on July 5, 1811. The first president, taking office on July 5, 1811, was actually the president of a triumvirate of the first established Republic of Venezuela that rotated the presidency weekly. The person serving as president during the week of July 5 was one of the signatories of the Declaration of Independence: Cristóbal Mendoza. Mendoza shared the triumvirate with Juan Escalona and Baltasar Padrón. A second triumvirate followed on April 3, 1812 whose members were Francisco Espejo,  and Francisco Javier Ustariz.

Owing to the profound confusion of the Venezuelan War of Independence and the period of Gran Colombia over what is now Venezuela, this page has gaps between 1813 and 1819. For this period in time, historians refer to the Republic of Venezuela as the Second Republic of Venezuela (1813–1814) and the Third Republic of Venezuela (1817–1819) as Simon Bolivar twice reestablished the republic. The Congress of Angostura appointed Simón Bolívar "Supreme Commander of the Republic of Venezuela" (Jefe Supremo de la República de Venezuela) from 1819 until 1830.

In 1830, José Antonio Páez declared Venezuela independent from Gran Colombia and became president, taking office on January 13, 1830. Although he was not the first president of Venezuela (having in mind Cristóbal Mendoza in 1811), he was the first head of state of independent Venezuela, after the dissolution of Gran Colombia.

Presidents of Venezuela since independence (1830–present)
The list below includes interim "caretaker" as well as regular serving presidents, and democratically installed presidents as well as those installed by other means (e.g.; Marcos Pérez Jiménez).

State of Venezuela (1830–1864)

United States of Venezuela (1864–1953)

Republic of Venezuela (1953–1999)
Venezuela took the name of Republic of Venezuela with the adoption of the 1953 constitution, written by the Constituent Assembly elected in November 1952. The Presidents of Venezuela under this constitution (as well as the 1961 Constitution, which kept the name) were officially styled as President of the Republic of Venezuela.

This period of the history of Venezuela began with the dictatorship of Marcos Pérez Jiménez. After a short period of political instability following Pérez Jiménez's exile in 1958, democracy was restored in the country with the election of Democratic Action leader Rómulo Betancourt as president in 1959. This marked the beginning of the democratic period, started with the Puntofijo Pact and which was characterized by the prevalence of the bipartidism of the two main political parties in the country at the time, Democratic Action and Copei.

The second presidency of Carlos Andrés Pérez (1989–93) saw a deep economic crisis, a series of major riots known as the Caracazo in 1989, in which hundreds were killed by security forces, two coup attempts in 1992, and the 1993 impeachment of Pérez. That same year, Rafael Caldera became the first President of Venezuela not to belong to either Democratic Action or Copei in over forty years, having been elected under the banner of National Convergence. The bipartidism ended in 2000 when a new constitution entered in force.

Bolivarian Republic of Venezuela (1999–present)

Venezuela became the "Bolivarian Republic of Venezuela" with the adoption of the 1999 constitution, which renamed the country in honor of Simón Bolívar. The new constitution was promulgated by President Hugo Chávez, who served de jure from 1999 until his death in 2013. The new constitution augmented the presidential term from five years to six years.

Chávez's presidency was interrupted shortly in 2002 following a failed coup d'état attempt that put Pedro Carmona in office for a day. After government-loyal forces ousted Carmona from Miraflores, Vice President Diosdado Cabello assumed executive control for a couple of hours until Chávez could be restored. In 2009, a constitutional referendum approved the elimination of term limits, which allowed Chávez to be re-elected again in 2012. However, Chávez died in March 2013, only three months into his fourth term, and was succeeded by his Vice President Nicolás Maduro, who was elected the following month to finish Chávez's term, enforcing the majority of Chávez's economic policies.

Under Maduro, Venezuela has seen a rise in unemployment, shortages of goods, closures of several corporations, and the deterioration of productivity. Maduro – who has seen a sharp decline in his approval ratings in correlation to the economic collapse, and was the subject of a 2016 recall referendum to remove him from office that was later suspended – has been criticized for what opponents consider to be him backsliding the country towards a full-fledged authoritarian regime; this led to an ongoing constitutional crisis stemming from a March 2017 ruling by the Supreme Tribunal of Justice (whose members largely consist of Maduro supporters) that removed immunity for National Assembly members (including those opposing Maduro), which subsequently made a brief assumption of legislative powers from the Assembly, and the Constituent Assembly election, which resulted in the formation of a Constituent Assembly intended to rewrite the 1999 constitution. These actions have worsened tensions and sparked violence during protests against the Maduro administration over concerns that Maduro would eliminate or significantly erode the independence of Venezuela's democratic institutions and shift the country towards one-man rule.

The process and results of the May 2018 Venezuelan presidential election were widely disputed. The opposition-majority National Assembly declared Maduro a "usurper" of the presidency on the day of his second inauguration and disclosed a plan to set forth its president, Juan Guaidó as the succeeding acting President of the country under article 233 of the Venezuelan Constitution. A week later, the Supreme Tribunal of Justice declared that the presidency of the National Assembly was the "usurper" of authority and declared the body to be unconstitutional.

Minutes after Maduro took the oath as President of Venezuela, the Organization of American States (OAS) approved a resolution in a special session of its Permanent Council declaring Maduro's presidency illegitimate and urging new elections. Special meetings of the OAS on 24 January and in the United Nations Security Council on 26 January were held but no consensus was reached. Secretary-General of the United Nations António Guterres called for dialogue. During the 49th General Assembly of the Organization of American States, on 27 June, Guaidó's presidency was recognized by the organization.

Guaidó declared himself acting president and swore himself in on 23 January. Maduro's government has accused the United States of organizing a coup d'état to remove him and take control of the country's oil reserves. Guaidó rejects the characterization of his actions as a coup, saying that his movement is backed by peaceful volunteers. As of June 2019, Guaidó has been recognized as the acting President of Venezuela by 54 countries. Internationally, support has followed traditional geopolitical lines, with allies China, Cuba, Iran, Russia, Syria, and Turkey supporting Maduro; and the US, Canada, and most of Western Europe supporting Guaidó as acting president. The United Nations has continued to recognize the Maduro presidency as the legal representative of Venezuela as of December 2019.

On 22 December 2022, the Venezuelan opposition held an initial vote to remove Guaidó's interim government from its leadership and on 30 December 2022, three of the four main opposition political parties (Justice First, Democratic Action and A New Era) approved a reform to dissolve the interim government and instead create a commission of five members to manage foreign assets, stating the failure of the interim government to achieve the goals it had set. The amendment was voted by the opposition as deputies sought a united stategy ahead of the presidential elections scheduled for 2024 with the reform approved with 72 votes in favor, 29 against and 8 abstentions, thus dissolving the Guaidó government effective as of 5 January 2023.

Timeline

See also

 List of current heads of state and government
 List of vice presidents of Venezuela

Notes

References

External links
 Official portal for the President
 Official government site (Government Online)

Venezuela
 
Presidents